Bandh (Devanagari: बंद) (literally: shutting down) is a form of protest used by political activists in South Asian countries such as India and Nepal. It is similar to a general strike. During a bandh, a political party or a community declare a general strike. For example, a Bharat bandh is a call for a bandh across India, and a bandh can also be called for an individual state or municipality.

The community or political party declaring a bandh expects the general public to stay at home and not report for work. Shopkeepers are expected to keep their shops closed, and public transport operators are expected to stay off the road. There have been instances when large cities have been brought to a standstill. A bandh is a form of civil disobedience.

Ban
The Supreme Court of India banned bandhs in 1998, but political parties still organize them. In 2004, the Supreme Court of India fined two political parties, Bharatiya Janata Party (BJP) and Shiv Sena, for organizing a bandh in Mumbai as a protest against bomb blasts in the city. Supreme Court permits only voluntary closure of establishments during bandhs.

Notable bandhs
Bandhs are often by opposition parties.  The National Democratic Alliance (NDA) and 13 parties not belonging to the United Progressive Alliance parties called for a nationwide bandh on 5 July 2010, to protest a fuel price hike. The bandh prevented Indians from carrying out day-to-day tasks, especially in states that were ruled by the NDA and the Left. In Nepal, calls for bandhs have increased due to political instability.

On 20 September 2012, the BJP and other parties called for a nationwide bandh in response to economic reforms undertaken by Prime Minister Manmohan Singh and his finance minister Palaniappan Chidambaram. Chief among their grievances were the cut in subsidies for diesel and cooking gas and the decision to allow foreign investors to own majority stakes in the retail sector, including supermarkets and department stores.

On 3 January 2018, Prakash Ambedkar called for a bandh in response to an attack on Buddhists, as well as some Hindu dalit and Sikh people by supporters of the Hindutva ideology at Koregaon Bhima in Pune district, Maharashtra, and the lack of police action against the culprits. More than 50 percent of Maharashtra's population supported or participated in the bandh.

See also
 Gherao
 Hartal
 Dharna
 Strike action
 Political activism in Kerala

References

Further reading
 Johari, J. C. (1982). Comparative Politics. Sterling Publishers Pvt. Ltd, New Delhi. . Chapter 20: Techniques of Pressure Politics. pp. 393–410.

Civil disobedience
Protests in India
Protests in Nepal
General strikes in India
Political terminology in India